The D.C. Armor was a professional indoor football team that began play in the American Indoor Football Association (AIFA) in the 2009 season. The team was based in Washington, D.C., with home games at the under-renovation D.C. Armory. The Armor were the first professional football team to play within the District of Columbia since the Washington Redskins left for FedExField in 1997. The Armor was also the area's first indoor football team since the Washington Commandos played in the Arena Football League in 1990, and the only arena/indoor football team to play within the district (the Commandos played in the Capital Centre and the Patriot Center) until the formation of the Washington Valor, who played their home games at Capital One Arena.  After one, poorly attended season, the Armor folded.

Season-By-Season

|-
|2009 || 4 || 10 || 0 || 4th Northern || --

2009 season schedule

External links
 D.C. Armor
 League PR announcing Armor's entry
 Armor's 2009 Stats

American Indoor Football Association teams
Sports in Washington, D.C.